Ivan Aleksandrovich Skobrev (born 8 February 1983 in Khabarovsk) is a Russian speed skater.

Career

At the 2010 Winter Olympics in Vancouver, he won the bronze medal in the 5000 meters as well as the silver medal in the 10000 meters. He is the 2011 European and World Allround Champion.

At the 2006 European Championships he finished in fifth place. He qualified for four distances for the 2006 Winter Olympics in Turin. He finished eleventh in the 5000 meters, sixth in the 1500 and 10000 meters and fifth in the team pursuit.

In December 2017, he was one of eleven Russian athletes who were banned for life from the Olympics by the International Olympic Committee, after doping offences at the 2014 Winter Olympics. The ban was subsequently overturned on appeal to the court of arbitration for sport (CAS).

Personal records
To put these personal records in perspective, the WR column lists the official world records on the dates that Skobrev skated his personal records.

With a score of 146.008 points, Skobrev is in 10th place on the Adelskalender as of March 10, 2019. He was in fifth place most of the time from February 12, 2011, to December 3, 2017.

References

External links
 
 
 Ivan Skobrev at SpeedSkatingStats.com
 Ivan Skobrev at SSN.info
 Personal records from Jakub Majerski's Speedskating Database
 Historical World Records. International Skating Union.
 Photos of Ivan Skobrev

1983 births
Russian male speed skaters
Speed skaters at the 2006 Winter Olympics
Speed skaters at the 2010 Winter Olympics
Speed skaters at the 2014 Winter Olympics
Olympic speed skaters of Russia
Olympic medalists in speed skating
Medalists at the 2010 Winter Olympics
Olympic silver medalists for Russia
Olympic bronze medalists for Russia
Speed skaters at the 2007 Winter Universiade
Medalists at the 2007 Winter Universiade
Universiade medalists in speed skating
Sportspeople from Khabarovsk
Sportspeople from Norwalk, Connecticut
Living people
Doping cases in speed skating
Russian sportspeople in doping cases
World Allround Speed Skating Championships medalists
Universiade silver medalists for Russia